Elastic is a word often used to describe or identify certain types of elastomer, elastic used in garments or stretchable fabrics.

Elastic may also refer to:

Alternative name
 Rubber band, ring-shaped band of rubber used to hold objects together
 Bungee cord, a cord composed of an elastic core covered in a sheath
 Chinese jump rope, a children's game resembling hopscotch and jump rope

As a proper name
 Elastic (album), a 2002 album by jazz saxophonist Joshua Redman
 Elastic NV, the company that releases the Elasticsearch search engine
 Elasticsearch, a search engine based on Apache Lucene
 Amazon Elastic Compute Cloud (Amazon EC2), a web service that provides secure, resizable compute capacity in a cloud format
 Elastics (orthodontics), rubber bands used in orthodontics

See also 
 Elastic collision, a collision where kinetic energy is conserved
 Elastic deformation, reversible deformation of a material
 Elasticity (disambiguation)
 Flex (disambiguation)
 Stretch (disambiguation)